The discography of American rapper Lil Dicky consists of a studio album, a mixtape, an EP, five singles as a primary artist and two singles as a featured artist. His debut studio album, Professional Rapper, was self-released on July 31, 2015. It peaked on the Billboard 200 at number seven alongside charting on two US component charts at number one and two. Lil Dicky's debut mixtape, So Hard, was released on May 22, 2013. In 2014, he released his debut single "Lemme Freak". It charted in the US Comedy chart at 3rd and was certified gold by the RIAA. His first song to peak on the Hot 100 was "Save Dat Money", a collaboration with rappers Rich Homie Quan and Fetty Wap. The song peaked at number 71 on the Billboard Hot 100. His highest-charting song in the United States is the 2018 collaboration with American R&B singer Chris Brown, titled "Freaky Friday". The song was certified platinum in three countries and 5× platinum in the United States. In 2019, he released the single, "Earth", in association with Leonardo DiCaprio Foundation, which was made to raise awareness for the earth and featured multiple guest vocalists. The song debuted and peaked at number 17 on the Billboard Hot 100.

Studio albums

Mixtapes

EPs

Singles

As lead artist

As featured artist

Guest appearances

Music videos

References

Discographies of American artists
Hip hop discographies